HMS Thistle was a Shamrock-class schooner launched at Bermuda on 27 February 1802. She participated in one notable single ship action that resulted (many years later) in the Admiralty awarding her crew the Naval General service Medal (NGSM). She was wrecked on 6 March 1811.

Career
Lieutenant Peter Proctor commissioned Thistle in 1808.

On 25 March 1809 the French sloop Fortunée arrived in Bermuda, a prize to Thistle. Fortunée had been sailing from Guadeloupe to Bordeaux.

In late October Thistle sent into Halifax, Nova Scotia the American vessel Susquehanna, Brown, master. Susquehanna had been sailing from Baltimore to Tonningen.

On 10 February 1810 Thistle gave chase to a vessel. After seven hours Thistle caught up with her quarry, which hoisted Batavian colours, opened fire, and attempted to ram Thistle. The two vessels exchanged fire for about an hour when the Batavian vessel attempted to sail off. A running engagement ensued. After four hours the Dutch vessel struck. According to Lieutenant Proctor, she was the Batavian naval corvette , of 10 guns, though pierced for 18. She had a crew of 52 men under the command of Lieutenant J. Sterling. Her passengers included the former lieutenant-governor of Batavia, Admiral Buyskes ([ Buijskes]), together with his suite. She was on her way to New York with a part cargo of indigo and spices. Havik had one man killed and seven men badly wounded, one of the wounded being the Admiral. On Thistle, a marine was killed and seven men were wounded, Lieutenant Proctor being one of the wounded. During the initial exchange of fire three of Thistles carronades had been dismounted.

According to Dutch sources, Havik, Lieutenant Steelingh, captain, had an estimated burthen of 200–250 tons. She had been built in Batavia and was on her way to Europe. She was armed with six 3-pounder guns and two 1-pounder swivel guns. (This gave her a broadside of 10 pounds, versus Thistles broadside of 66 pounds.) Her complement consisted of 32 men: 30 crew, and two passengers – the Admiral, and his aide. She struck after she had expended all her ammunition.

Thistle and Havik arrived at Bermuda on 20 February. Havik arrived at Portsmouth from Bermuda on 14 June 1810. Her cargo was reported to have a value of £40,000.

Lieutenant Proctor was promoted to Commander in May 1810. In 1847 the Admiralty awarded the NGSM with clasp "Thistle 10 Feby. 1810" to any surviving claimants from the action; there were none.

Lieutenant George M'Pherson replaced Proctor in June 1810. Thistle carried to London the seaman Robert Jeffrey who in 1807 Commander Warwick Lake of  had marooned on Sombrero, Anguilla.

Loss
The government hired Thistle to carry dispatches and the January mail for New York from Falmouth, Cornwall. She sailed on 12 January 1811. Lloyd's List reported that Thistle had been lost on 6 March 1811 near New York, United States with the loss of six of her crew. The mail was saved and delivered to New York on 9 March.

The subsequent courtmartial established that the loss was due to the inaccuracy of the chart, which showed incorrect soundings. In all, four men died in attempts to get to shore. The rest were pulled to shore on a line from the beach. Over the next few days some of her stores were salvaged and sold. On 13 March the wreck was sold to a local man for $135. The wreck occurred on Maransquam Beach, about nine leagues south of Sandy Hook.

Citations and references
Citations

References
 
 
 

Shamrock-class schooners
1808 ships
Ships built in Bermuda
Schooners of the Royal Navy
Maritime incidents in 1811